Matt Lennox (born 1980 in Orillia, Ontario) is a Canadian fiction writer, whose 2015 novel Knucklehead was a longlisted contender for the 2017 edition of Canada Reads.

A film studies graduate of York University, he enlisted in the Canadian Army and served in Kandahar, Afghanistan. He then studied creative writing at the University of Guelph, and published his debut short story collection Men of Salt, Men of Earth in 2009. The book was a finalist for the ReLit Awards in the short fiction category in 2010.

He published his debut novel The Carpenter in 2012. The novel was also translated into French as Rédemption. Knucklehead followed in 2015.

References

1980 births
21st-century Canadian novelists
21st-century Canadian short story writers
Canadian male novelists
Canadian male short story writers
Writers from Ontario
People from Orillia
York University alumni
Living people
University of Guelph alumni
21st-century Canadian male writers